Mauro Alves Riquicho (born 7 April 1995) is a Portuguese former professional footballer who played as a right-back.

Club career
Born in Cascais, Lisbon District of Mozambican descent, Riquicho joined Sporting CP's youth system at the age of 12. On 27 April 2013, still a junior, he made his professional debut with the B team, playing the full 90 minutes in a 1–1 away draw against C.D. Aves in the Segunda Liga.

Riquicho scored his only goal in the competition on 11 December 2013, but in a 3–1 away loss to S.L. Benfica B. He went on to have a long spell on the sidelines, due to a fracture to his left fibula.

International career
Riquicho represented Portugal at the 2015 FIFA U-20 World Cup. He played all matches in New Zealand, helping his country reach the quarter-finals.

Riquicho won his only cap for the under-21 team on 8 September 2015, playing the entire 6–1 away rout of Albania in the 2017 UEFA European Championship qualifiers.

References

External links

1995 births
Living people
Portuguese people of Mozambican descent
Sportspeople from Cascais
Portuguese footballers
Association football defenders
Liga Portugal 2 players
Sporting CP B players
Louletano D.C. players
C.D. Fátima players
Portugal youth international footballers
Portugal under-21 international footballers